The 1995–96 Marshall Thundering Herd men's basketball team represented Marshall University from Huntington, West Virginia in the 1995–96 Season. Led by second year head coach Billy Donovan, the Herd finished with a final record of 17–11. Their second round elimination in the Southern Conference tournament led to the team not receiving an invitation to the NCAA tournament for the ninth consecutive year. After the season, however, Donovan left Marshall to accept a job as the new head coach of Florida, whom he would lead to national championships in 2006 and 2007. Following his tenure at Florida, which would end in 2015, Donovan would become the head coach of the NBA's Oklahoma City Thunder.

Roster

Schedule and results

|-
!colspan=8| Regular season
|-

|-
!colspan=8| SoCon tournament

|-

References

Marshall Thundering Herd men's basketball seasons
Marshall
Marsh
Marsh